Loveclough  is a small hamlet at the edge of the Rossendale Valley, in Lancashire, England, near Crawshawbooth and Rawtenstall, 20 miles north of Manchester, 21 miles east of Preston, and 44 miles south east of Lancaster.

Governance
Loveclough is part of the Rossendale and Darwen parliamentary constituency and the Borough of Rossendale.

Geography and tourism
On the edge of the Pennines, various wildlife can be seen in the area, as well as lakes and rivers, such as the Limy Water, a tributary of the River Irwell which it joins in Rawtenstall.

Transport

Loveclough is served by the X43 Witch Way bus service to Rawtenstall, Burnley and Manchester.

Gallery

References

Hamlets in Lancashire
Geography of the Borough of Rossendale